Gyraulus crista, commonly called the Nautilus ramshorn, is a minute species of freshwater snail, an aquatic pulmonate gastropod mollusk in the family Planorbidae, the ram's horn snails.

Subspecies
Subspecies include:
 Gyraulus crista cristatus Draparnaud, 1805
 Gyraulus crista nautilus Linnaeus, 1767
 Gyraulus crista spinulosus Clessin

Distribution
The distribution of this species is Holarctic (spread across the northern part of the whole northern hemisphere). The distribution type is circumpolar wide-temperate, and the range includes:
 Czech Republic - least concern (LC)
 Slovakia
 Germany
 Italy
 Netherlands
 Sweden
 The British Isles, Great Britain, Ireland
See Fauna Europaea for Europaean distribution.

Shell description
The minute shell is nearly planispiral in its coiling, but the spire is actually considerably sunken rather than raised (which is usually the case with gastropods).

The shell has regular transverse ridges which form points extending beyond the main curve of the periphery of the shell.

The shell color is a translucent yellowy-brown. The maximum shell dimension is about 3 mm.

Ecology
This snail lives on water plants in clear still freshwater.
In Ireland it is common in medium to very small habitats including slow streams, drains and marsh and fen pools
It is occasionally found in very acid waters.

This minute species, although technically a pulmonate gastropod, does not use air for respiration but instead absorbs oxygen through its mantle cavity which is full of water.

References

External links 

 Gyraulus crista at AnimalBase

crista
Gastropods described in 1758
Taxa named by Carl Linnaeus